Hibiscus lunariifolius, the lunaria-leaf hibiscus, is a species of flowering plant in the family Malvaceae, native to India and Sri Lanka, and introduced to quite a number of seasonally dry tropical areas in Africa. It is cultivated in Nigeria for its fiber, a good quality analog of jute.

References

lunariifolius
Flora of India (region)
Flora of Sri Lanka
Plants described in 1800